E&M may stand for:

E and M signaling, a type of supervisory line signaling that uses DC signals on separate leads
Encrypt-and-MAC (E&M), an approach to authenticated encryption
Electromagnetism, sometimes also called electricity and magnetism, a branch of physics
Electromechanics, combines electrical engineering and mechanical engineering
Evaluation and Management Coding, a medical billing process in the United States
Exchange and Mart, a defunct long-established British sales publication

Mechatronics, a portmanteau of electronics and mechanics